Brentwood may refer to:

Cities, towns and other places

Australia
 Brentwood, Western Australia
 Brentwood, South Australia

Canada
 Brentwood, Calgary, a neighbourhood in Calgary, Alberta
 Brentwood, Nova Scotia
 Brentwood, Ontario, a community within the township of Clearview, Ontario
 Brentwood Bay, British Columbia
 Brentwood Boulevard, Sherwood Park, Alberta
 Brentwood Park (or "Brentwood"), a neighbourhood in Burnaby, British Columbia
 Brentwood Town Centre a.k.a. The Amazing Brentwood, shopping mall in Burnaby, BC

New Zealand
 Brentwood, a neighborhood in Upper Hutt, Wellington

United Kingdom
Borough of Brentwood, a local government district
Brentwood, Essex, a town in the borough
Brentwood and Ongar (UK Parliament constituency)

United States
 Brentwood, California, a city in the San Francisco Bay Area
 Brentwood, Los Angeles, a district of Los Angeles 
 Brentwood Circle, Los Angeles
 Brentwood Glen, Los Angeles
 Brentwood, Maryland
 North Brentwood, Maryland
 Brentwood, a historic district in Holliston, Massachusetts
 Brentwood (McComb, Mississippi), listed on the NRHP in Mississippi
 Brentwood, Missouri
 Brentwood, New Hampshire
 Brentwood, New York
 Brentwood, North Carolina, a neighborhood in Raleigh, North Carolina
 Brentwood-Darlington, Portland, Oregon
 Brentwood, Pennsylvania
 Brentwood, Tennessee
 Brentwood, Austin, Texas
 Brentwood, Houston, Texas
 Brentwood (Washington, D.C.), a neighborhood in Washington, D.C.

Schools

Australia
 Brentwood Secondary College, Glen Waverley, Melbourne

Canada
 Brentwood College School, Mill Bay, British Columbia

United Kingdom
 Brentwood County High School, Essex
 Brentwood School, Essex

United States
 Brentwood Academy, Tennessee
 Brentwood High School (New York)
 Brentwood School (Los Angeles)

Other uses
 Brentwood Associates, a long-time USA private equity firm
 Brentwood (CTrain), a light rail station in Calgary, Alberta, Canada
 Brentwood Magazine, a magazine that covers fashion, travel, and entertainment news for Los Angeles

See also
 Brent Wood, Canadian politician
 Brent Woods (1855–1906), American soldier
 Brentwood School (disambiguation)